Golofa imperialis is a species of rhinoceros beetles belonging to the family Scarabaeidae.

Description
Protarsus is equal to or larger than protibia. Male pronotum has a long prothoracic horn with a triangular tip. The head show a thin horn. The underside of the body is covered in golden hair. The front legs are longer than the others.

Distribution
This species is present in Mexico and Central America.

References

Dynastinae
Beetles described in 1858